Aq Bolagh (also Romanized as Āq Bolāgh; also known as Ak-Bulag and Āqbulāq) is a village in Ijrud-e Bala Rural District, in the Central District of Ijrud County, Zanjan Province, Iran. At the 2006 census, its population was 674, in 157 families.

References 

Populated places in Ijrud County